Compton's O.G. is the twelfth studio album by American rapper MC Eiht. It was released on October 10, 2006 through B-Dub Records with distribution by Universal Music. It was the third to feature his rap group Compton's Most Wanted on all songs and includes guest appearances from Fingazz, Mr. Criminal and Stomper (Soldier Ink).

Track listing
"Intro"
"Robbery"
"Get With Me"
"Classic"
"Want 2 Ride" (featuring Fingazz)
"Mashing"
"So Hood"
"Here She Comes"
"She's So Freaky"
"Skit"
"Underground"
"Fake Niggaz"
"Where You From"
"Can't Hang With Us"
"Murder" (featuring Stomper (Soldier Ink))
"Skit"
"Music 2 Gangbang" (featuring Mr. Criminal)
"Hi Power Mega Mixx"

2006 albums
MC Eiht albums
Compton's Most Wanted albums